is the debut studio album by the Japanese rock band Mucc, released on January 7, 2001 on the independent label Peanuts. The first pressing of the album included a bonus track and a sticker, but was limited to only five thousand copies. A second pressing was released on June 17 the same year, titled Tsūzetsu ~Inshōchigai~, with the hidden track absent, a different track order and no sticker. A third pressing released on June 10, 2002, had the same track order as the second pressing, but included a bonus track different from the first pressing.

Track listing

Note
 A re-recording of "Shōfu" was featured on their 2006 single Horizont. It was re-recorded again on the 2020 limited single Shōfu to commemorate 20th anniversary of their first single.
 The album was re-recorded as a self-cover album titled Sin Tsūzetsu released on August 9, 2017.

Mucc albums
2001 debut albums